Talkie Walkie is the third studio album by French electronic music duo Air, released on 26 January 2004 by Virgin Records. "Alone in Kyoto" was included on the soundtrack to the 2003 film Lost in Translation, and "Run" was used in both the Veronica Mars episode "Nobody Puts Baby in a Corner" and the 2004 French film Lila Says. "Talkie-walkie" means walkie-talkie in French.

As of November 2006, Talkie Walkie had sold 161,000 copies in the United States, according to Nielsen SoundScan. The album shipped 405,000 copies outside France within two weeks of its release, according to Virgin Records.

Critical reception

Talkie Walkie received generally positive reviews from music critics. At Metacritic, which assigns a normalised rating out of 100 to reviews from mainstream publications, the album received an average score of 75, based on 29 reviews. Rob Sheffield of Rolling Stone called the album "excellent" and commented that Air "return to what they do best: elegantly moody soundtrack music for imaginary films." NME reviewer Piers Martin commented, "It is light and fluffy, of course, but tender and romantic, synthetic and soulful, too. It sounds, effortlessly, new and different, fresh and focused, clean and Zen, no doubt the outcome of Godin and Dunckel's decision to play and programme all the instruments and perform all the vocals on the record themselves in Paris without any external assistance...". Praise was given to the subtle touch producer Nigel Godrich and string arranger Michel Colombier presumably brought to the album at its final stage, and the more personal and tighter songwriting.

Pitchfork named Talkie Walkie the 20th best album of 2004, and later placed it at number 191 on its list of the top 200 albums of the 2000s.

Track listing

Personnel
Credits adapted from the liner notes of Talkie Walkie.

Musicians
 Malik Mezzadri – flute 
 Jessica Banks – additional vocals 
 Brian Reitzell – ride cymbal 
 Jason Falkner – bass 
 Lisa Papineau – additional vocals 
 Joey Waronker – percussion 
 Michel Colombier – piano ; string arrangements

Technical
 Air – production
 Nigel Godrich – additional recordings, production, mixing
 Darrell Thorp – mixing assistance ; street sounds recording 
 Bob Ludwig – mastering

Artwork
 Richard Prince – cover art
 Aaron Klein – technical assistance
 Claude Gassian – cover photo
 Jenna Felling – interior photos
 Marc Teissier du Cros – polaroids
 Roger Gorman – design

Charts

Weekly charts

Year-end charts

Certifications and sales

Notes

References

2004 albums
Air (French band) albums
Albums produced by Nigel Godrich
Astralwerks albums
Virgin Records albums